Many countries have national networks of controlled-access highways, the names of which vary from one country to another e.g. freeway or motorway. The networks do not always include all such highways, or even all the major ones in the country.

Asia

: ṭarīq siyār (طريق سيار)
: Lebuhraya
: Gaosu Gōnglù (高速公路)
: Highways
: Expressways
: Toll Road/Jalan Tol (all tolled)
: Āzādrāh (آزادراه)
: ṭarīq siyār (طريق سيار)
: kvish mahir (כביש מהיר)
: 
: ṭarīq siyār (طريق سيار)
: Avtomagistral (Автомагистраль)
: ṭarīq siyār (طريق سيار)
: Autoroutes
: Lebuhraya
: Expressway (အမြန်လမ်း) (all tolled)
: Kosokdoro (고속도로)
: ṭarīq siyār (طريق سيار)
: Motorways/Maḥrak rāst (محرک راست)
: Expressways (all tolled)
: ṭarīq siyār (طريق سيار)
: ṭarīq siyār (طريق سيار)
: Expressways
: Gosokdoro (고속도로)
: Expressways (all tolled)
: ṭarīq siyār (طريق سيار)
: Gaosu Gōnglù (高速公路)
: Thangluang phiset (ทางหลวงพิเศษ)
: Otoyol
: ṭarīq siyār (طريق سيار)
: Đường cao tốc

Europe
 International E-road network (Note: not all E-roads are limited access with no at-grade intersections)

: Autostradë
: Avtomayughri (ավտոմայրուղի)
: Autobahnen
: Avtoyol
: Mahistral' (Магістраль)
: Autosnelwegen/Autoroutes/Autobahnen
: Autoput
: Avtomagistrala (автомагистрала)
: Autocesta
: Dálnice
: Avtokinitódromos (Αυτοκινητόδρομος)
: Motorvej
: Põhimaantee
: Moottoritiet
: Autoroutes
: Chkarosnuli avtomagistrali (ჩქაროსნული ავტომაგისტრალი)
: Autobahnen
: Avtokinitódromos (Αυτοκινητόδρομος)
: Autópálya and Autóút
: Motorway/Motorbhealach
: Autostrade
: Autostradë
: Automaģistrāle
: Automagistralė
: Autoroutes/Autobahnen
: Autosnelwegen
: Avtopat (Автопат)
: Motorvei
: Autostrady and drogi ekspresowe
: Auto-estradas
: Autostrada
: Avtomagistral (Автомагистраль)
: Autoput (Аутопут)
: Dial'nica
: Avtoceste
: Autopistas and Autovías
: Motorvägar
: Autobahnen/Autoroutes/Autostrade
: Otoyol
: Avtomahistral' (Автомагістраль)
: Motorways

Oceania
: Freeways
: Motorways

North America

: Highways/Autoroutes
: Autopistas
: Autopistas
: Autopistas
: Autopistas
: Autopistas
: Highways
: Autoroutes
: Autopistas
: Autopistas
: Highways
: Freeways/Highways/Autopistas

South America

: Autopistas
: Autovías
: Rodovias
: Autopistas
: Autopistas 
: Autopistas 
: Autopistas
: Autopistas
: Autopistas

Africa

: Autoroutes 
: Motorways
: Autoroutes 
: ṭarīq siyār (طريق سيار)
: Autovías
: Motorways
: Motorways
: Motorways/Autoroutes
: Autoroutes
: Motorways
: Autoroutes
: Autoroutes
: Autosnelwegen/Motorways
: Autoroutes

Notes

 
Controlled-access